Belle and Sebastian is a 1965 French TV children's serial which was adapted in the 1966 novel Belle et Sébastien by Cécile Aubry. It was 13 episodes long and starred Aubry's son Mehdi as Sebastien, whilst Aubry appeared as the episode host and co-directed episodes with Jean Guillaume.

Synopsis
Six-year-old orphan boy Sebastian lives with his friend, six-year-old Pyrenean Mountain dog Belle, in the French Alps with the villagers of Belvédère.

Production
It was filmed as a live-action show in black-and-white in France under its original name in 1965. In 1967 it was dubbed and the title was anglicized. It first appeared in the UK on BBC1 on Monday afternoons, running from 2 October 1967 to 1 January 1968. Shown in the time slot after Blue Peter, it was repeated several times and became an important ingredient of school holiday television. Filmed in and around the village of Belvédère in Alpes-Maritimes, its authentic locations, sensitive writing, and winning performances by the actors, makes it an enduring classic. Its deep theme is the power and importance of love. The part of Sebastian was played by Mehdi El Glaoui, Cécile Aubry's son from her marriage to Si Brahim El Glaoui, the eldest son of Thami El Glaoui, the Pasha of Marrakesh, whom she met in 1950 while filming The Black Rose.

Legacy 
The serial spawned two further 13 part colour film sequels Sébastien parmi les hommes ("Sebastian Among Men") (1968) retitled Belle, Sebastian and the Horses by the BBC and Sébastien et la Mary-Morgane ("Sebastian and the Mary Morgan") (1970) which was not broadcast by the BBC.

The Scottish indie pop band Belle and Sebastian took their name from the TV series.

Cast 
 Flanker the dog as Belle
 Mehdi El Glaoui [credited as Pierre Medhi] as Sebastien
 Edmund Beauchamp as Cesar
 Jean-Michel Audin as Doctor Guillaume
 Dominique Blondeau as Jean
 Paloma Palma [credited as Paloma Matta] as Angelina
 Hélène Dieudonné as Celestine

References

External links 
 

1965 French television series debuts
1965 French television series endings
1968 British television series debuts
1968 British television series endings
BBC Television shows
French drama television series
British television shows based on children's books
Television shows based on French novels
French children's television series
1960s British children's television series
Television shows set in France
Office de Radiodiffusion Télévision Française original programming